Manuel de los Santos (born 1928) was a Filipino boxer. He competed in the men's light welterweight event at the 1956 Summer Olympics.

References

External links

1928 births
Possibly living people
Filipino male boxers
Olympic boxers of the Philippines
Boxers at the 1956 Summer Olympics
Place of birth missing
Light-welterweight boxers